The Queen City Storm were a professional hockey team based in Evendale, Ohio, a Cincinnati suburb. The Storm were members of the All American Hockey League and played their home games at Sports Plus Cincinnati.

History
The Storm were approved for membership in the AAHL in August 2010. The Storm suspended operations mid-season in January 2011 with some its players being sent to play for the Michigan Moose.

References

All American Hockey League (2008–2011) teams
Ice hockey teams in Ohio
Sports teams in Cincinnati
Ice hockey clubs established in 2010
Ice hockey clubs disestablished in 2011
2010 establishments in Ohio
2011 disestablishments in Ohio
Hamilton County, Ohio